Rosario María Murillo Zambrana (born 22 June 1951) is a Nicaraguan politician and poet who has held the position of Vice President of Nicaragua, the country's second highest office, since January 2017 and First Lady of Nicaragua since 2007 as the wife of President Daniel Ortega. Murillo has served as the Nicaraguan government's lead spokesperson, government minister, head of the Sandinista Association of Cultural Workers, and Communications Coordinator of the Council on Communication and Citizenry. She was sworn in as vice president of Nicaragua on 10 January 2017. In August 2021, she was made subject to personal sanctions by the European Union, over alleged human rights violations.

Life and career
Murillo was born in Managua, Nicaragua. Her father was Teódulo Murillo Molina (1915–1996), a cotton grower and livestock owner. Her mother was Zoilamérica Zambrana Sandino (1926–1973; the daughter of Orlando José Zambrana Báez and Zoilamérica Sandino Tiffer), a niece of General Augusto César Sandino (1895–1934) who fought against the US occupation in Nicaragua. Murillo's maternal grandmother, Zoilamérica Sandino Tiffer, was a paternal half-sister of Augusto Nicolás Calderón Sandino, also known as Augusto César Sandino. She married Daniel Ortega and had eight children. According to Nicaraguan historian Roberto Sánchez, Murillo is maternally related to Nicaragua's national hero, Augusto Sandino.

Murillo attended high school at the Greenway Convent Collegiate School in Tiverton, Great Britain, and studied Art at the Institut Anglo-Suisse Le Manoir at La Neuveville in Switzerland. Murillo possesses certificates in the English and French language, granted respectively by the University of Cambridge in Great Britain. She also attended the National Autonomous University of Nicaragua in her hometown, where she later became a language professor at the Instituto de Ciencias Comerciales and the Colegio Teresiano during 1967–1969.

Sandinista
Murillo joined the Sandinista National Liberation Front in 1969, and provided shelter in her house, which was located in the Barrio San José Oriental in Managua, to Sandinista guerrillas, among them Tomás Borge, one of the founders of the FSLN.

During the early 1970s Murillo worked for La Prensa as a secretary to two of Nicaragua's leading political and literary figures, Pedro Joaquin Chamorro and Pablo Antonio Cuadra. Murillo was arrested in Estelí in 1976 for her activities in politics. Soon after, she fled and lived for several months in Panama and Venezuela. She later moved to Costa Rica where she dedicated herself completely to her political work with the FSLN, helped start Radio Sandino, and met her future husband, Daniel Ortega. When the Sandinistas overthrew Somoza in 1979, she returned to Nicaragua. Murillo and Ortega were married in 2005.

Politics 
Murillo started to gain power politically in 1998 after defending Ortega after he was accused by his stepdaughter, Zoilamérica Narváez Murrillo, Murillo's daughter, of sexually abusing her for many years. Murillo stated that the accusations were "a total falsehood" and afterwards sided unconditionally with Ortega and publicly shunned her daughter who has still maintained that her accusations were true. The case was thrown out by the Supreme Court in 2001 because the statute of limitations had expired.

Murillo helped re-brand Ortega after three unsuccessful election bids in 1990, 1996, and 2001 as a less extreme candidate. Ortega was elected president in 2006 and re-elected in 2011. In the 2016 general election Murillo ran as Ortega's vice-presidential candidate. She is "widely seen as the power behind the presidency" according to Al Jazeera's Lucia Newman. Murillo appointed herself as "communications chief", a position which she used to address the public regularly before her vice-presidency.

During her term, a series of protests broke out, resulting in 309 deaths by July 2018, some 25 of casualties being under the age of 17. Murillo and aide Néstor Moncada Lau were particularly targeted in an executive order issued by U.S. President Donald Trump on 27 November 2018. This executive order is one of several sanctions placed against her and her husband's government by the United States since the unrest began.

Personal life 
A polyglot, she speaks Spanish, English, Italian and French; she also reads German. Rosario Murillo is Roman Catholic with strong Marian veneration

Murillo defended Ortega when her daughter Zoilamérica accused her stepfather Ortega of sexual abuse in the 1990s, which still affects her reputation with some Nicaraguans. Although Zoilamérica tried to pursue legal action, Ortega had immunity as a member of the National Assembly.

Murillo has had a history of struggling with both alcohol and drug abuse. She is known for her New Age beliefs and practices.

In popular culture 
Rosario Murillo is featured in the 2019 documentary film Exiliada, which revolves around her daughter, Zoilamérica Narváez, and her sexual abuse complaints against Daniel Ortega.

Published works
Gualtayán (1975)
Sube a nacer conmigo (1977)
Un deber de cantar (1981)
Amar es combatir (antología) (1982)
En espléndidas ciudades (1985)
Las esperanzas misteriosas (1990)
Angel in the deluge (1992) translated from the Spanish by Alejandro Murguía.

References

Further reading 
 Murillo, Rosario. "Intellectuals and the Sovereignty of the People." Contemporary Marxism, no. 6 (1983): 183–92.
 Manupelli, George. "Aid to the Arts of Nicaragua." Leonardo 16, no. 2 (1983): 159–159. doi:10.2307/1574841.

1951 births
Living people
First ladies of Nicaragua
Nicaraguan revolutionaries
Nicaraguan Roman Catholics
Catholic socialists
Nicaraguan Christian socialists
Nicaraguan women poets
20th-century Nicaraguan poets
People from Managua
Sandinista National Liberation Front politicians
People of the Nicaraguan Revolution
Women in war in Central America
Women in warfare post-1945
Communist women writers
Christian communists
Vice presidents of Nicaragua
Women vice presidents
20th-century Nicaraguan women writers
Female Christian socialists
National Autonomous University of Nicaragua alumni
21st-century Nicaraguan women politicians
21st-century Nicaraguan politicians